The International Society for Cerebral Blood Flow & Metabolism is a professional society based in Rockville, Maryland for physicians and scientists focused on cerebrovascular function.

History
Technical improvements in the study of cerebral blood flow pioneered by Niels Lassen and David Ingvar in the mid-twentieth century drove demand for meetings dedicated to the discipline. In 1965, the first regional Cerebral Blood Flow (rCBF) symposium was held in Lund, Sweden. In March 1980, following discussions between Bo K. Siesjö and Louis Sokoloff, a steering committee society was formed, including Sokoloff, Siesjö, Konstantin A. Hossman, Igor Klatzo, Eric Mackenzie, Marcus Raichle, MartinReivich, and Fred Plum. The International Society for Cerebral Blood Flow & Metabolism was first announced at the 2021 rCBF meeting in St. Louis, Missouri.

Annual meeting
ISCBFM holds an annual meeting called Brain & Brain Pet. The biannual meeting is held in cities throughout the world, with the 2022 meeting taking place in Glasgow.

Publishing
The Journal of Cerebral Blood Flow & Metabolism has been an important element of the ISCFBM since the organization's founding. Additionally, ISCFBM has published a newsletter titled The Organ since 1990.

References

Neuroscience organizations